The 1991 Barcelona Dragons season was the inaugural season for the franchise in the newly created World League of American Football (WLAF). The team was led by head coach Jack Bicknell, and played its home games at Estadi Olímpic de Montjuïc in Barcelona, Catalonia, Spain. They finished the regular season in second place of the European Division with a record of eight wins and two losses. In the postseason, the Dragons beat the Birmingham Fire in the semifinals before losing to the London Monarchs in World Bowl '91.

Personnel

Staff

Roster

Schedule

Standings

Game summaries

Week 10: at London Monarchs

World Bowl '91: vs London Monarchs

Awards
After the completion of the regular season, the All-World League team was selected by the league's ten head coaches. Overall, Barcelona had six players selected, with two on the first team and four on the second team. The five selections were:

 Scott Adams, tackle (second team)
 Bruce Clark, defensive end (first team)
 Scott Erney, quarterback (second team)
 Ron Goetz, inside linebacker (second team)
 Gene Taylor, wide receiver (first team)
 Barry Voorhees, guard (second team)

References

Barcelona Dragons seasons